Wyndham Lewis (7 October 1780 – 14 March 1838) was a British politician and a close associate of Benjamin Disraeli.

Lewis was the son of Reverend Wyndham Lewis, of Tongwynlais, Glamorganshire. He sat as Member of Parliament for Cardiff from 1820 to 1826, for Aldeburgh from 1827 to 1829 and for Maidstone from 1835 to 1838.

Lewis married Mary Anne, daughter of John Evans, in 1816. They had no children. He died in March 1838, in London's Mayfair, aged 57. His widow married Benjamin Disraeli in 1839 and was created Viscountess Beaconsfield in 1868.

Mary Anne Lewis and Wyndham Lewis are mentioned in the book penned by the former politician, Douglas Hurd, about the needy "D'Israeli", on page 79. 
A quote from that book, tells us;

"It was at this moment that Mary Anne Lewis entered the scene.  D'israeli had met Mary Anne five years previously, when he described her as a 'rattle and flirt'.  At the Bulwers', Disraeli had been asked to take her down to dinner, he responded: "Oh anything rather than that insufferable woman, but Allah is Great." Five years on she seemed less insufferable to D'Israeli when he stood for Maidstone alongside her husband, Wyndham Lewis.  Mrs Lewis already had a friendly eye for D'Israeli and during the contest the couple loaned him money for his election expenses.  Both men were elected, but Wyndham died suddenly several months later.  From that moment on, the connection between Mary Anne and D'Israeli grew in intensity...

Notes

References 
 Welsh Biography Online

External links 
 

1780 births
1838 deaths
Members of the Parliament of the United Kingdom for English constituencies
Members of the Parliament of the United Kingdom for Cardiff constituencies
UK MPs 1820–1826
UK MPs 1826–1830
UK MPs 1835–1837
UK MPs 1837–1841
Burials at Kensal Green Cemetery